Tayug, officially the Municipality of Tayug, is a 3rd class municipality in the province of Pangasinan, Philippines. According to the 2020 census, it has a population of 45,241 people.

The town of Tayug got its unique name not from people who were influential or from name of saints but from a very tall tree that once grew in the heart of the town; the bacayao tree was so tall that in Ilocano they call it “Tayag”. In view of the difficulty of the people to pronounce the letter “L” they change it to letter “T” by common usage. Hence, the name Tayug came about.

History
On June 22, 2003, Mayor Guerrero Zaragoza was assassinated by communist rebels from the New People's Army (NPA) as he was leaving a cockfighting arena at 2:45 a.m., with the cockpit's caretaker Wilfredo Hidalgo also gunned down.

Geography

Barangays
Tayug is politically subdivided into 21 barangays. These barangays are headed by elected officials: Barangay Captain, Barangay Council, whose members are called Barangay Councilors. All are elected every three years.

Agno
Amistad
Barangobong
Carriedo
C. Lichauco
Evangelista
Guzon
Lawak
Legaspi
Libertad
Magallanes
Panganiban
Brgy. Poblacion A
Brgy. Poblacion B
Brgy. Poblacion C
Brgy. Poblacion D
Saleng
Santo Domingo
Toketec
Trenchera
Zamora

Climate

Demographics

Economy

Government
Tayug, belonging to the sixth congressional district of the province of Pangasinan, is governed by a mayor designated as its local chief executive and by a municipal council as its legislative body in accordance with the Local Government Code. The mayor, vice mayor, and the councilors are elected directly by the people through an election which is being held every three years.

Elected officials

References

External links

Tayug Profile at PhilAtlas.com
Municipal Profile at the National Competitiveness Council of the Philippines
Bolinao at the Pangasinan Government Website
Local Governance Performance Management System
[ Philippine Standard Geographic Code]
Philippine Census Information

1817 establishments in the Philippines
Municipalities of Pangasinan